Estonian Orthodox Church may refer to:

 Estonian Apostolic Orthodox Church, an autonomous church subordinate to the Ecumenical Patriarchate of Constantinople
 Estonian Orthodox Church of the Moscow Patriarchate, a semi-autonomous diocese of the Russian Orthodox Church
 Eastern Orthodoxy in Estonia, the development of Eastern Orthodox Christianity in Estonia

et:Eesti Õigeusu Kirik
pt:Igreja Ortodoxa Estoniana
ru:Православие в Эстонии